Desmoglein-4 is a protein that in humans is encoded by the DSG4 gene.

See also 
 List of conditions caused by problems with junctional proteins

References

Further reading